This is a list of the main career statistics of Italian professional tennis player Sara Errani.

Performance timelines

Only main-draw results in WTA Tour, Grand Slam tournaments, Fed Cup/Billie Jean King Cup and Olympic Games are included in win–loss records.

Singles
Current after the 2022 French Open.

Doubles
Current through the 2022 French Open.

Significant finals

Grand Slam finals

Singles: 1 (1 runner-ups)

Doubles: 8 (5 titles, 3 runner-ups)

WTA Premier Mandatory & Premier 5 finals

Singles: 1 (1 runner-up)

Doubles: 9 (5 titles, 4 runner-ups)

WTA career finals

Singles: 19 (9 titles, 10 runner-ups)

Doubles: 42 (27 titles, 15 runner-ups)

WTA Challenger finals

Singles: 3 (2 titles, 1 runner-up)

Doubles: 1 (title)

National team competition finals

Fed Cup: 3 (3 titles)

ITF Circuit Finals

Singles: 7 (5 titles, 2 runner–ups)

Doubles: 11 (7 titles, 4 runner–ups)

Top 10 wins

Record against top 10 players

 Errani's match record against certain players who have been ranked in the top 10. Players who are active are in boldface.

See also
Roberta Vinci career statistics

Notes

References

External links

Tennis career statistics